Un cuerpo de mujer ("A Woman's Body")  is a 1949 Mexican film. It was written by Luis Alcoriza.

External links
 

1949 films
1940s Spanish-language films
Mexican black-and-white films
Mexican romantic drama films
1949 romantic drama films
1940s Mexican films